206 (two hundred [and] six) is the natural number following 205 and preceding 207.

In mathematics
206 is both a nontotient and a noncototient. 206 is an untouchable number. It is the lowest positive integer (when written in English as "two hundred and six") to employ all of the vowels once only, not including Y. The other numbers sharing this property are 230, 250, 260, 602, 640, 5000, 8000, 9000, 80,000 and 90,000. 206 and 207 form the second pair of consecutive numbers (after 14 and 15) whose sums of divisors are equal. There are exactly 206 different linear forests on five labeled nodes, and exactly 206 regular semigroups of order four up to isomorphism and anti-isomorphism.

In science
There are 206 bones in the typical adult human body.

See also
 The Year 206 AD
 Cessna 206, a single engine light aircraft
 Bell 206, a light helicopter
 The Peugeot 206, a French supermini automobile
 US Area code 206, and The 206 slang terminology for the urban part of the greater Seattle area
 206 (Ulster) Battery Royal Artillery (Volunteers) "The Ulster Gunners", part of British Army's 105th Regiment Royal Artillery (Volunteers)
 206 Hersilia, a fairly large Main belt asteroid
 206 Bones, a novel by Kathy Reichs

References

Integers